Macy's Recordings (Queen of Hits) was a Houston-based record label that released recordings of popular musicians around the southern United States.  In April 1949, they famously recorded Lester Williams' song "Winter Time Blues" on their R&B series which became a hit.  They would go on to record country and Cajun music as well.

History

The record label was started by husband and wife, Charles D. Henry and Macy Lela Henry, whom worked alongside supervisor Steve Poncio.  Poncio worked as general manager for Macy's in 1946 and then founded United Record Distributing Company in 1949.  Macy ran a department store based in Houston, Texas (unrelated to the famous New York department store) and in 1948, they began distributing records for other labels, such as Modern Music, including their back catalog material. and even had an office in Dallas.  In 1949, they decided to create their own label to sell and distribute from their store.  They created the Macy's Record Distribution Company and they used Bill Holford's ACA Studios in Houston to record the music.  The place was known for its high quality sound.

Their first recordings released were with Jim Reeves. However, they would make their mark on blues music in 1949 by recording Lester Williams' song "Winter Time Blues" and then in 1950, they would sign and record Clarence Garlow, releasing a version of his song "Bon Ton Rolla". The company would hire other dealers to distribute their music in Nashville, Atlanta and New Orleans.

These artists would go on to record other songs for Macy. Macy's didn't fare well in the marketplace despite the quality of their music. They were competing against other Houston brands such as Duke-Peacock, D Records, Starday, Freedom, Sittin' In With and Gold Star. By June 1951, many of their signature artists moved to Modern Records and Aladdin Records ending the Macy's label production.  The catalog is currently owned by Fivepin Music based in Toronto.

Artists
 Jim Reeves, 1949
 Clarence Garlow, 1949
 Smokey Hogg, 1950
 Hubert Robinson, 1950
 Lester Williams, 1949
 Harry Choates,

Discography

Compilations
 Cat N Around (#875512 KrazyKat/Interstate, 1997) 
 Texas Hillbilly: The Best of Macy's Hillbilly Recordings (ACRCD125 Acrobat, 2006)
 Queen Of Hits: The Macy's Recordings Story (ACRCD228 Acrobat, 2011)

References

Defunct record labels of the United States